Pierdomenico is a surname and given name, likely of Italian origin. Notable people with the surname or given name include:

Surname
Germano Pierdomenico (born 1967), Italian former professional racing cyclist

Given name
Pierdomenico Baccalario (born 1974), Italian author
Pierdomenico Perata (born 1962), Italian physiologist